Weem Castle is a former castle near Weem, Scotland. The castle was located near Castle Menzies.

The castle became the seat of the Menzies family after Comrie Castle was partially destroyed by fire in 1487. Weem Castle was destroyed in 1502 by Nigel Stewart of Garth in a dispute over the lands of Fothergill. The stone and timber were used in the construction of Castle Menzies.

References

Further reading
Millar, A H. (1890a) The historical castles and mansions of Scotland: Perthshire and Forfarshire. Paisley.

Castles in Perth and Kinross
Ruined castles in Perth and Kinross
Demolished buildings and structures in Scotland
Former castles in Scotland